Valeri Silogava (April 20, 1945 – March 17, 2011) was a Georgian historian and professor.

Biography
In 1963 he graduated from Poti V Secondary School. In 1969 he graduated with honors from the Faculty of History of Tbilisi State University. After graduating from Tbilisi State University in 1969, with the recommendation of Shota Meskhia, he was sent to the post-graduate course of the Korneli Kekelidze Institute of Manuscripts, where he took a course in Source Studies and Historiography under Professor Nodar Shoshiashvili. In 1970, while still a postgraduate student, Valeri Silogava started working at the Institute of Manuscripts, where he developed as a researcher and developed his circle of scientific interests – epigraphy, paleography, diplomatics.

In 1972 he graduated from the Cornelius Kekelidze Institute of Manuscripts with a degree in Source Studies and Historiography.

In 1972 he defended his PhD dissertations ("Lapidary inscriptions of Western Georgia IX-XVIII centuries as a historical source"), and in 1989 his doctoral dissertations ("Written Monuments of Svaneti"). Nodar (Nukri) Shoshiashvili was his scientific supervisor during his postgraduate studies.

Shota Meskhia made a great contribution to his training in the field of science.

Valeri Silogava has been a leading researcher at the Georgian State Museum since 1990 and was Head of the Department of Georgian History at the Akhaltsikhe Branch of Tbilisi State University. Since 2005 he was a leading researcher at the Institute of Manuscripts and head of the Department of Archival Funds.

In 2006 he was elected an associate professor at the Faculty of Humanities of Ivane Javakhishvili Tbilisi State University, at the same time he was a professor at Akhaltsikhe Teaching University, He led lecture courses in the history of Georgia, the history of the Georgian Church, source studies, palaeography and historiography.

Awards and honours
 Order of Honor (2001)
 Ekvtime Takaishvili Award of the Georgian National Academy of Sciences (2009)

Literature
Kalandia G., Kikvidze L., "Valeri Silogava (Memoirs, Scientific Articles)", Tbilisi, 2011
Discovery in the Oshki Temple (Interview with Valeri Silogava), Khvamli No.3–4, 2003 – pp. 29–31

External links
 Website of Georgian History Institute 
Memorial – Valeri Silogava
 Valeri Silogava — Historian

1945 births
2011 deaths
21st-century historians from Georgia (country)
Academic staff of Tbilisi State University
20th-century historians from Georgia (country)
Recipients of the Order of Honor (Georgia)